The fourth American Basketball Association All-Star Game was played January 23, 1971 at Greensboro Coliseum in Greensboro, North Carolina before an audience at 14,407. Al Bianchi of the Virginia Squires coached the East, with Bill Sharman of the Utah Stars coached the West.

Results 
Rick Barry scored four points in the final 49 seconds as the East overcame an 18-point third-quarter deficit.  Mel Daniels of the Indiana Pacers was named MVP after scoring 29 points and grabbing 13 rebounds.

Western Conference

Eastern Conference
 
  
Halftime — West, 69-59
Third Quarter — West, 97-92
Officials: Norm Drucker and Joe Gushue
Attendance: 14,407.

References

External links 
 ABA All Star Game at RemembertheABA.com

All-Star
Sports competitions in Greensboro, North Carolina
ABA All-star game
ABA All-star game